Nanyang Crescent MRT station is a future elevated Mass Rapid Transit (MRT) station on the Jurong Region Line in Western Water Catchment, Singapore.  The station will be located within the Nanyang Technological University (NTU).

History
On 9 May 2018, the Land Transport Authority (LTA) announced that Nanyang Crescent station would be part of the proposed JRL. The station will be constructed as part of Phase 3, consisting of 7 stations – a 4 station extension to this station from Boon Lay and a 3 station extension to Peng Kang Hill from Tawas. It was expected to be completed in 2028. However, the restrictions on construction due to the COVID-19 pandemic has led to delays, with the completion date pushed to 2029.

Construction is scheduled to start in the second quarter of 2021, with expected completion in 2029.

Starting on 31 July 2022, a section of Nanyang Drive had to be temporarily diverted for the station's construction, with two bus stops along the road shifted accordingly. The overhead bridge connecting the Nanyang Technological University (NTU) North Spine and the National Institute of Education (NIE) was demolished on 11 September that year.

Details
Nanyang Crescent station will serve the JRL and will be located between the Nanyang Gateway and Peng Kang Hill stations. The official station code will be JW4. The station will be located in the Nanyang Technological University (NTU), along Nanyang Drive near the junction with Nanyang Walk.

References

Mass Rapid Transit (Singapore) stations
Nanyang Technological University
Proposed railway stations in Singapore
Railway stations scheduled to open in 2029